This page presents the results of the men's volleyball tournament at the 1958 Asian Games, which was held from 25 May to 31 May 1958 in Tokyo, Japan.

Results

|}

Final standing

References
 Results

External links
OCA official website

Men's volleyball